Another Job for the Undertaker is a 1901 silent comic trick film made at Edison's recently opened studio at 41 East 21st Street in Manhattan. It was photographed by Edwin S. Porter and co-directed by Porter and George S. Fleming. The two-shot film was copyrighted on May 15, 1901 and is approximately two minutes in length. It lacks a head title, which would have been supplied by projecting a separate lantern slide before screening the film.

Plot
An Edison catalog describes the film:

Shows a bedroom in a hotel. On the wall of the room is a conspicuous sign "Don't blow out the gas." A hayseed enters the room, accompanied by a bellboy. The boy deposits the Rube's bag and umbrella, turns a somersault, and vanishes through the door. The Rube then removes his hat and coat and places them upon the table. They immediately vanish. He then blows out the gas. The scene then instantly changes to a funeral procession, headed by Reuben's hearse, and followed by the carriages of his country friends. Strictly up-to-date picture.

In popular culture
Reuben or Rube (like Uncle Josh) was a stereotypical country bumpkin: a comic character who flourished in American popular culture in the later nineteenth and early twentieth centuries. He is perplexed by modernity. In this case, he treats a gas lamp like a candle, blowing out the flame which leads to his asphyxiation and death. Other Edison films from this period feature Rube, including Rube's Visit to the Studio, Rubes in the Theatre and Rube and Mandy at Coney Island.

See also
Silent film
Edwin Stanton Porter

References

External links

1901 films
1900s English-language films

1900s fantasy comedy films
American silent short films
American black-and-white films
Films directed by Edwin S. Porter
1901 short films
Articles containing video clips
American comedy short films
American fantasy comedy films
1900s American films
Silent American comedy films